The following is a list of the officially designated symbols of the U.S. state of Missouri.

State symbols

See also
 State of Missouri
 List of Missouri-related topics
 Lists of United States state insignia

References

External links
 Missouri State Symbols and Emblems 

State symbols
Missouri